Samuel Kistohurry (born 1 March 1995) is a French boxer. He competed in the featherweight division at the 2020 Summer Olympics. He also competed at the 2021 World Championships, where he won a medal.

References

1995 births
Living people
French male boxers
Featherweight boxers
Olympic boxers of France
AIBA World Boxing Championships medalists
Pessac
Boxers at the 2019 European Games
European Games competitors for France
French people of Mauritian descent
Black French sportspeople
Boxers at the 2020 Summer Olympics
Sportspeople from Gironde